Stanley James Weaver (1890-1973), was a Welsh lawn bowls international who competed in the 1934 British Empire Games.

Bowls career
At the 1934 British Empire Games he won the bronze medal in the pairs event with Thomas Davies.

He bowled for the Swansea and Llandrindod Wells Bowls Clubs. He was a Welsh representative from 1927-1935 and was Welsh national champion on five occasions winning the singles in 1932, the pairs in 1934 and the rinks in 1925, 1927 & 1933.

Personal life
He was a building contractor by trade and married Elizabeth Charles in 1923.

References

Welsh male bowls players
Bowls players at the 1934 British Empire Games
Commonwealth Games bronze medallists for Wales
Commonwealth Games medallists in lawn bowls
1890 births
1973 deaths
Medallists at the 1934 British Empire Games